Silence in the Snow is the seventh studio album by American heavy metal band Trivium. It was released on October 2, 2015, through Roadrunner Records. It is the first and only album to feature third drummer Mat Madiro, who joined the band in May 2014 and before he had departed from the band in December 2015. It is the band's only album to date to not feature any harsh vocals. Michael "Elvis" Baskette was hired as the producer whom the band had met while recording In Waves album back in 2011.

The band premiered "Silence in the Snow" and "Blind Leading the Blind" on their headlining performance on Bloodstock Open Air. "Blind Leading the Blind" was later released as a single on YouTube August 13, 2015. On August 21, 2015, a music video was released on YouTube for "Blind Leading the Blind".

The third single "Until the World Goes Cold" premiered on Octane on August 26, 2015. The music video premiered on YouTube the day after. The single landed on No. 10 at Top 10 Active Rock chart in February 2016, making it first ever Trivium single in the Top 10.

On September 25, 2015, a week prior the worldwide release, the entire album (including two bonus tracks) was officially streamed on Octane. Heafy, Beaulieu and Gregoletto were also participating in the radio program, breaking down the meaning of songs and commenting on the songwriting process.

The fourth single "Dead and Gone" was released with its music video on March 10, 2016.

Composition

Influences, style and themes
Guitarist Corey Beaulieu cites Rainbow, Black Sabbath and Dio as the main influences for the album, as well as touring experience with Heaven & Hell back in 2007. He said the title song was written during Shogun sessions but was eventually cut from the final release, as the band thought it did not fit "Shogun's sound".

During the album's making, vocalist Matt Heafy worked with vocal coach Ron Anderson in order to improve his voice which he blew in 2014. The result of his training is a more melodic, clean singing style, making Silence in the Snow the first Trivium album not to feature any kind of unclean vocals at all.

Silence in the Snow marks the return of 7-string guitars, which have been previously used in The Crusade and Shogun.

AllMusic says that with Silence in the Snow, Trivium has completed their move towards arena rock, that they used the "building blocks of metal" to create a more popular sound.

Critical reception

Upon its release, Silence in the Snow received generally positive reviews from critics. Review aggregator Metacritic gave the album an 80 out of 100 based on five reviews from professional critics. The Guardian stated: "If they continue down this path, Silence might be remembered as the moment Trivium secured their status as modern metal greats."

Commercial performance
The album debuted at No. 3 on Billboards Top Rock Albums chart, selling 17,000 copies in its first week.

Track listing

PersonnelTrivium Matt Heafy – lead vocals, guitars
 Corey Beaulieu – guitars, backing vocals
 Paolo Gregoletto – bass, backing vocals
 Mat Madiro – drums, percussionProduction and additional musicians'
 Michael Baskette – producer
 Josh Wilbur – mixing
 Ihsahn – composer on "Snøfall"
 Brad Blackwood – mastering

Charts

References

2015 albums
Roadrunner Records albums
Trivium (band) albums
Albums produced by Michael Baskette